St. Joseph Neighborhood Historic District is a national historic district located at Indianapolis, Indiana.  The district encompasses 57 contributing buildings in a predominantly residential section of Indianapolis. It was developed between about 1855 and 1930, and include representative examples of Italianate and Queen Anne style architecture. Located in the district are the separately listed Bals-Wocher House, William Buschmann Block, Delaware Court, Pearson Terrace, and The Spink.  Other notable buildings include the Christian Place complex, Fishback-Vonnegut-New House, Henry Hilker House, Apollo-Aurora Rowhouses, Israel Traub Store (c. 1865), and Lorenzo Moody House.

It was listed on the National Register of Historic Places in 1991.

References

External links

Historic districts on the National Register of Historic Places in Indiana
Italianate architecture in Indiana
Queen Anne architecture in Indiana
Historic districts in Indianapolis
National Register of Historic Places in Indianapolis